Michalis Zacharopoulos (born 18 July 1995) is a Greek professional footballer who plays as a defensive midfielder for Football League club Kalamata.

References

1995 births
Living people
Greek footballers
Football League (Greece) players
Gamma Ethniki players
PAS Lamia 1964 players
Kalamata F.C. players
Panegialios F.C. players
Association football midfielders
Footballers from Kalamata